Zhambolat Lokyaev is a Russian Greco-Roman wrestler. He won the gold medal in the 63 kg event at the 2021 European Wrestling Championships held in Warsaw, Poland.

In 2020, he won the gold medal in the 63 kg event at the Individual Wrestling World Cup held in Belgrade, Serbia.

Achievements

References

External links 
 

Living people
Year of birth missing (living people)
Place of birth missing (living people)
Russian male sport wrestlers
European Wrestling Championships medalists
European Wrestling Champions
21st-century Russian people